The 5 kilometre cross-country skiing event was the shortest distance of the women's cross-country skiing programme at the 1984 Winter Olympics, in Sarajevo, Yugoslavia. It was the sixth appearance of the 5 km race. The competition was held on Sunday, February 12, 1984 at Veliko Polje, Igman.

Marja-Liisa Hämäläinen of Finland took her second Gold medal of the games following her win in the 10 km race. All 52 athletes who entered the race finished with an official time.

Results

References

External links
Official Olympic Report

Women's cross-country skiing at the 1984 Winter Olympics
Women's 5 kilometre cross-country skiing at the Winter Olympics
Oly
Cross